Farewell is the eighth studio recording released by the Toshiko Akiyoshi – Lew Tabackin Big Band.  The album received a 1980 Grammy award nomination for "Best Jazz Instrumental Performance - Big Band."

Track listing 
All songs composed and arranged by Toshiko Akiyoshi:
LP side A
 "After Mr. Teng" – 8:46
 "Song for the Harvest" – 6:47
 "Shades of Yellow" – 6:09
LP side B
 "Autumn Sea" – 8:46
 "Farewell (to Mingus)" – 10:13

Personnel 
 Toshiko Akiyoshi – piano
 Lew Tabackin – tenor saxophone and flute
John Gross – tenor saxophone
Dan Higgins – alto saxophone
Gary Foster – alto saxophone
Bill Byrne – baritone saxophone
Buddy Childers – trumpet
Steven Huffsteter – trumpet
Larry Ford – trumpet
Mike Price – trumpet
Rick Culver – trombone
Hart Smith – trombone
Bruce Fowler – trombone
Phil Teele – bass trombone
Bob Bowman – bass
Steve Haughton – drums

References

References / External Links
RCA Victor (Japan) Records RVC RVJ-6078
Ascent Records ASC 1000
Yanow, Scott, Farewell review, [ allmusic.com]
23rd Grammy Awards (1980) - list of nominees at india-server.com

Toshiko Akiyoshi – Lew Tabackin Big Band albums
1980 albums